Banco Nossa Caixa was a Brazilian bank founded on September 7, 1971. On May 23, 2008, their shares rose to 43 percent. Banco do Brasil, however, slowly dropped due to the rise of Banco Nossa Caixa, making it the second largest.

References

Defunct banks of Brazil
Banks disestablished in 2008
Banks established in 1916